Rothesay is the principal town on the Isle of Bute, in the council area of Argyll and Bute, Scotland. It lies along the coast of the Firth of Clyde. It can be reached by ferry from Wemyss Bay, which offers an onward rail link to Glasgow. At the centre of the town is the 13th-century ruin Rothesay Castle, unique in Scotland for its circular plan.

Etymology
The English-language name, which was written as Rothersay in 1321, Rosay around 1400, and Rothissaye around 1500, originally referred to the castle. Since the castle was surrounded by a moat connected to the sea, the name may have originally meant 'Rother's Isle' (the Old Norse suffix  means "isle"), or it may be an alteration of the Gaelic word , meaning 'fort'.

History

The old town centred on Rothesay Castle, which was built in the 13th century. The castle has long stood in ruins, but it is nevertheless picturesque, and was a focal point for tourists as soon the town began developing into a seaside resort.

Rothesay was the county town in the civil parish of Rothesay, which was located in the former county of Bute. The county historically included the islands of Great Cumbrae, Little Cumbrae and Arran. Rothesay Town Hall and County Buildings overlooks the castle.

During the Victorian era, Rothesay became a popular tourist destination. In particular, it was hugely popular with Glaswegians going "doon the watter" (literally “down the water” – a reference to the waters of the Firth of Clyde). Its wooden pier was busy with steamer traffic. It was home to one of Scotland's many hydropathic establishments, which were in vogue at the time. It also had an electric tramway, the Rothesay and Ettrick Bay Light Railway, which ran across the whole island of Bute and carried passengers to one of the island's largest beaches (the tramway closed in the mid-1930s).

A war memorial designed by Pilkington Jackson was erected in 1922. The Winter Gardens building, erected in 1923, was a centre of many activities in Rothesay in the mid-20th century, hosting some of the best-known music hall entertainers of the day. Rothesay Pavilion, opened in 1938, was another popular attraction. It was an example of International Modernist style architecture, and was designed by the Ayr architect, James Andrew Carrick. Although it later fell into disrepair, it remains a major landmark on the seafront today, and is currently undergoing a complete restoration.

In 1941 and 1942, the Officer Concentration Station Rothesay was also located here.

By the 1960s, Rothesay's heyday as a tourist mecca had largely ended. Inexpensive foreign package holidays had become more popular with UK residents. The Winter Gardens building was closed and lay in disuse for decades. However, it was redeveloped in the 1990s, and is now open as a tourist information and exhibition centre.

Duke of Rothesay

The heir to the British throne (currently William, Prince of Wales) is known in Scotland as the Duke of Rothesay. This practice was begun in the late 14th century by Robert III of Scotland, who regularly resided at Rothesay Castle, and first granted the title to his son David in 1398. At that time, the name Rothesay referred to the whole island of Bute, rather than to the town (which was known as Bute-town). The island of Bute (along with the island of Arran) was under the control of Robert III because he had inherited it from his Stewart ancestors. They had owned it ever since King Alexander III of Scotland (having received it from Norway under the Treaty of Perth of 1266) assigned it to Robert III's great-grandfather, Alexander Stewart. The two islands were privately owned by the Stewart family until Robert II (Alexander Stewart's grandson and Robert III's father) inherited the throne from his mother, after which the islands became the property of the Crown.

Once Robert III had conferred this title on his son, the title continued to be given to every heir of the Scottish throne thereafter. Following the Union of the Crowns in 1603, the heir to the British throne was always also formally considered “heir to the Scottish throne” and so acquired the title.

Unlike the title's English equivalent (Duke of Cornwall), the title Duke of Rothesay does not come with any land attached to it in the form of a Duchy. That is because control of the land was instead given to Robert III's half-brother and to the latter's descendants, who acquired the title Marquess of Bute in the 18th century. The current marquess remains the main landlord of the island; his principal seat, Mount Stuart, lies a few miles to the south of Rothesay Castle.

Modern times

In August 2018, the Donald Campbell Bluebird hydroplane held trials on Loch Fad. It was the first time the vehicle had been in the water since it was recovered from Coniston Water in the Lake District after the 1967 accident in which Campbell was killed.

Culture
Rothesay has hosted the National Mòd twice: in 1908 and 1952.

Sport
The most successful sporting club on the island is the Bute Shinty Club, which has competed at the highest level of the sport (the Marine Harvest Premier League). The Bute club was promoted to the Premier League in 2006 by winning the South Division One competition. It is also a multiple-time winner of the Balliemore Cup.

The town has an amateur football club, Rothesay Brandane A.F.C. (nicknamed "The Danes".) It was founded in 1946. They played in the Scottish Amateur Football League starting in 1947, reached the semi-final of the Scottish Amateur Cup in 1948–49, and won the league in both the 1963–64 and 2000–01 seasons. In 2004, they transferred into the Caledonian Amateur Football League Division 2, and, having won promotion after the 2007–08 season, they currently play in Division 1. They also had a youth team for ages 15 and under, called the Rothesay Brandane Rovers. (In the 19th century, the town had a different football club called the Bute Rangers F.C., which competed for the Scottish Cup.)

The Bute County Cricket Club plays in the Western District Cricket Union Championship.

The island has three golf courses: the 18-hole Rothesay Golf Club is on the outskirts of the town; the 9-hole Bute Golf Course is near the sands of Stravannan Bay on the west coast of the island; and the rather unusual 13-hole Port Bannatyne Golf Club sits on the hills behind the town. There are also two putting greens on the town's seafront.

The town hosts the High School of Glasgow rugby camp every summer.

For bowling enthusiasts, Bute boasts four greens:  Ardbeg, Craigmore, Kingarth and Rothesay. The oldest of them,  the Rothesay Bowling Club, was established in the 1860s.
The Bute Bowling Association runs many local club competitions. It also runs an open tournament each August, in which both ladies and gentlemen may compete; as of 2014, that tournament was in its 57th year.

Education

Rothesay currently has three primary schools: St Andrews Primary School, Rothesay Primary School, and North Bute Primary School. It has one secondary school, Rothesay Academy. In 2007, a Rothesay Primary and Rothesay Academy formed a joint campus school, and the building that previously housed Rothesay Academy was closed.

Notable people

Prof Eleanor Campbell FRSE FRS FRSC FInstP: scientist (physical chemistry)
Nathanael Chalmers: explorer
Johnny Dumfries: former Formula One racing driver and Marquess of Bute
Thomas Gillies: New Zealand lawyer, judge and politician
Angela Haggerty: journalist and social commentator
George Leslie: colourist painter
Ian Jenkins: politician
Ashley Lilley: actor (Ali in Mamma Mia)
Sir William Macewen: pioneer in brain surgery
Sheina Marshall: zoologist
Troy Kennedy Martin: writer of Z-Cars
Jim McAlister: footballer (Greenock Morton F.C., Dundee F.C. and Blackpool F.C.)
John McIndoe: printer
Billy McIsaac: keyboardist for Slik, PVC2, and the Zones
Peter Monie: civil servant
Jane Ross: Scottish international footballer; reserve forward for Team GB's squad at the London 2012 Olympic Games
Prof Martin Smellie FRSE (1927-1988): biochemist
John Tiffin Stewart: civil engineer
Matthew Stewart: mathematician
John Stuart, 3rd Earl of Bute: First Scottish Prime Minister of Great Britain (buried in St Mary's Chapel, Rothesay).
John McLean Thompson: botanist
Sir Graham Watson: Liberal Democrat politician; member of the European Parliament
Lena Zavaroni: singer; child star

Climate
Like the rest of Scotland — and the British Isles in general - Rothesay has a maritime climate, with cool summers and mild winters. Because of its island location, the risk of severe frost is mitigated by the surrounding waters.

Gallery

References

Notes

Bibliography
 Coventry, Martin (2008) Castles of the Clans. Musselburgh. Goblinshead. 
 Johnston, James B (1892) “Place-Names Of Scotland” . Edinburgh: David Douglas. Archive.org. Retrieved 12 May 2018.
 Watson, W. J. (2004) The Celtic Place-Names of Scotland. Edinburgh. Birlinn. . First published 1926.

External links

 National Library of Scotland: SCOTTISH SCREEN ARCHIVE (selection of archive films about Rothesay)
 Bute at War Rothesay's role during World War II as the home port of HMS Cyclops and the 7th Submarine Flotilla.
 Caladonian MacBrayne, Rothesay page - website

 
Towns in Argyll and Bute
Burial sites of the Stuart of Bute family
Firth of Clyde
Marinas in Scotland
Towns and villages in Buteshire
Towns on Scottish islands
Isle of Bute
Parishes in the County of Bute